Necker may refer to:

 Necker (surname)
 Necker (ship), several ships
 Neckerchief, cloth worn round the neck
 Necker cube, optical illusion
 Necker Island (Hawaii)
 Necker Island (British Virgin Islands)
 Necker–Enfants Malades Hospital

See also
Neker (disambiguation)
Neckar (disambiguation)